Gas Chamber is the debut album by West Coast rapper C-Bo. It was released on April 20, 1993 on AWOL Records and SMG Solar Music Group. The album was produced by Mike Mosley. The album peaked at number 53 on the Billboard Top R&B/Hip Hop Albums. A music video was produced for the song "4-Deep". A remastered version of this album, called Gas Chamber 2, was released in 2019.

Track listing
"Black 64" - 2:15
"Gas Chamber" - 4:29
"Realer Than Real" - 3:02
"Danked Out" - 3:12
"Marked for Death" - 2:40
"Liquor Sto" - 3:41
"Scratch From" - 3:29
"Bald Head Nut" - 3:57
"Play 4G" - 4:01
"Survival In the Garden" - 3:09
"Chronic Conference" - 1:31
"4-Deep" - 4:38
"Shots Out" - 4:49

Samples
Bald Head Nut
"Jungle Boogie" by Kool & the Gang
Liquor Sto
"You Made a Change in My Life" by Bar-Kays
Marked for Death
"Hip Dip Skippedabeat" by Mtume
Play 4G
"Five Minutes of Funk" by Whodini
Realer Than Real
"Nuthin' but a 'G' Thang" by Dr. Dre
Survival in the Garden
"The Message" by Grandmaster Flash and The Furious Five

Chart history

References

External links 
 Gas Chamber at Discogs
 Gas Chamber at MusicBrainz

C-Bo albums
1993 debut albums
Self-released albums
G-funk albums